Prabhaathasandhya is a 1979 Indian Malayalam-language film, directed by P. Chandrakumar and produced by Madhu. The film stars Madhu, Srividya, Thikkurissy Sukumaran Nair and Jose. The film's score was composed by Shyam. It also marked the on-screen debut for Karthika as a child artist.

Cast
 
Madhu 
Srividya 
Thikkurissy Sukumaran Nair 
Jose 
Sankaradi 
Ambika 
Aranmula Ponnamma 
Janardanan 
M. G. Soman 
Seema 
Karthika

Soundtrack
The music was composed by Shyam with lyrics by Sreekumaran Thampi.

References

External links
 

1979 films
1970s Malayalam-language films
Films directed by P. Chandrakumar